Ancher Nelsen (October 11, 1904 – November 30, 1992), was an American politician who served as the 34th Lieutenant Governor of the state of Minnesota and an eight-term congressman.

Biography
Nelsen was born October 11, 1904, near Buffalo Lake, Minnesota, to Danish parents. He attended elementary school in Brownton, Minnesota, and graduated from Brownton High School in 1923. In 1924 he began operation of his 280-acre diversified farm at Hutchinson, McLeod County, Minnesota. In 1929 he married Ilo Zimmerman of Brownton; they had three children. Their son Bruce G. Nelsen served in the Minnesota House of Representatives.

He served on the District 75 Minnesota School Board from 1926 to 1935 and on the Lynn Township School Board from 1929 to 1935. Nelsen was a member of the Minnesota Senate, 1935–1949, and a delegate to the 1948 and 1952 Republican National Conventions. In 1952, he was elected the 34th Lieutenant Governor of Minnesota, but served less than one year (January 5-May 1, 1953). He resigned to become administrator of the Rural Electrification Administration Program, in Washington, D.C., serving in that post from 1953 to 1956.

Nelsen was elected as a Republican to the U.S. House of Representatives in 1958 and served in the 86th through the 93rd Congresses, from January 3, 1959, to his resignation December 31, 1974, three days before his final term expired. He did not seek renomination in 1974.

He died in Hutchinson, Minnesota, November 30, 1992, at age 88.

References

Minnesota Historical Society biography
Minnesota Legislators Past and Present

External links
 

 

1904 births
1992 deaths
Lieutenant Governors of Minnesota
Republican Party Minnesota state senators
School board members in Minnesota
American Lutherans
American people of Danish descent
Republican Party members of the United States House of Representatives from Minnesota
20th-century American politicians
People from Hutchinson, Minnesota
Farmers from Minnesota
20th-century Lutherans